Jennie Widegren is a choreographer, and one of the members of the Bounce Streetdance Company. 

Widegren has choreographed for So You Think You Can Dance - Scandinavia.  She also choreographed the opening segment of the second semifinal of the Eurovision Song Contest 2013 on May 14.

References 

1973 births
Living people
Swedish female dancers
Swedish choreographers
Place of birth missing (living people)